Handzame is a village in the Belgian province West Flanders. It is part of the Kortemark municipality, which also comprises the villages Werken, Zarren and Kortemark itself.

External links
Handzame @ City Review

Populated places in West Flanders